Michel Geiss is a French sound engineer, instrument designer and musician who was a long-time collaborator of Jean Michel Jarre. He has also collaborated with other famous French artists such as Marc Lavoine, Patrick Bruel or Laurent Voulzy. In 1978 during the recording of Équinoxe he designed the Matrisequencer 250, an instrument that later was used in Rendez-Vous (1986). The instrument was succeeded by the Geiss Digisequencer.

Notes and references 

Year of birth missing (living people)
Living people
French musicians
French audio engineers